Lampranthus is a genus of succulent plants in the family Aizoaceae, indigenous to southern Africa.

Description

The genus name "Lampranthus" means "shining-flowers" in Greek, and the species of this genus have unusually large, bright flowers, of a range of colours (sometimes even bi-coloured), that usually appear in summer, and frequently cover the plants entirely.

The species of this genus typically have long, smooth, elongated, succulent leaves. These can be triangular or cylindrical, and like all plants in its family, appear in opposite pairs on the shrubs' branches.

Lampranthus can be clearly distinguished from related genera by its seed capsules. 
The seed capsules of all of these genera have triangular valves, which open when they become wet, exposing the seed chambers (locules). In contrast to Ruschia, each valve in a Lampranthus capsule has two wings, on either side of it, but no visible closing body. Unlike in Delosperma, the seeds in Lampranthus seed chambers are partially covered by a covering membrane. Lampranthus seeds sometimes have visible stalks too.

Reproduction

All Lampranthus species flower between June and August (in the Northern Hemisphere) with flower colours including red, orange, peach, yellow and light pink through to magenta and purple. They are pollinated by many insects, such as bees, wasps and beetles.

Range

These plants are mainly found in Southern Africa, especially in arid areas, such as the Fynbos habitats.

Phytochemistry
L. aureus and L. spectabilis contains mesembrenol and low levels of related alkaloids such as mesembrenone and have sometimes been mismarketed as Kanna (Sceletium tortuosum) extract which contains higher levels of related alkaloids.

Selected species

 List sources :

Gallery

References

 
Aizoaceae genera
Taxa named by N. E. Brown